Schwendinger is a surname. Notable people with the surname include:

 Laura Schwendinger (born 1962), the first composer to win the prestigious American Academy in Berlin
 Peter J. Schwendinger (born 1959), Austrian arachnologist
 Raphael Schwendinger (born 1998), Liechtensteiner judoka

See also
 Schweninger